Guignardia musae is a plant pathogen that causes banana freckle a disease that forms water soaked lesions of banana fruit and is spread by rain splash.

References

External links

Fungal plant pathogens and diseases
Banana diseases
Botryosphaeriaceae
Fungi described in 1909